The 2015 Horsham District Council election took place on 7 May 2015 to elect members of Horsham District Council in England. It was held on the same day as other local elections and the 2015 United Kingdom general election. The Conservatives secured a majority of 17, which was the largest majority any party has ever achieved at a Horsham District Council election.

Council Composition 

Prior to the election, the composition of the council was:

After the election, the composition of the council was:

Results summary

Ward results

Billingshurst and Shipley

Bramber, Upper Beeding and Woodmancote

Broadbridge Heath

Chanctonbury

Chantry

Cowfold, Shermanbury and West Grinstead

Denne

David Sheldon was elected as a Liberal Democrat in Denne ward in 2011, the year when this seat was last up for election, he resigned from the party in 2014.

Forest

Henfield

Holbrook East

Holbrook West

Horsham Park

Itchingfield, Slinfold and Warnham

Nuthurst

Pulborough and Coldwatham

Roffey North

Independent candidate Nicholas Butler stood as a Liberal Democrat in 2011 in Roffey North.

Roffey South

Rudgwick

Rusper and Colgate

Southwater

Former Horsham Football Club manager, Gary Charman, stood as a candidate for the Liberal Democrats in Southwater following the council rejecting the football clubs planning application for a stadium at Hop Oast. The location of the ground falls into the Southwater ward and was opposed by the Conservative councillors representing the ward at the time. A different application at the same location was approved in 2017.

Steyning

Trafalgar

References

2015 English local elections
May 2015 events in the United Kingdom
2015
2010s in West Sussex